Sigmund Gundelfinger (14 February 1846 in Kirchberg an der Jagst – 13 December 1910 in Darmstadt) was a German-Jewish mathematician who introduced the Gundelfinger quartic and proved the completeness of the invariants of a ternary cubic.

Gundelfinger quartic 

Selected works

References

  
 

19th-century German mathematicians
20th-century German mathematicians
1846 births
1910 deaths
19th-century German Jews